Cross-country skiing at the 2015 Winter Universiade was held in Štrbské Pleso from January 25 to February 1, 2015.

Men's events

Women's events

Mixed events

Medal table

External links
Cross-country skiing results at the 2015 Winter Universiade.
Results book

 
Cross-country skiing
2015
Universiade
Winter Universiade